The Brooklyn Robins Dry Dock were an American soccer team which took its name from the workplace it represented. The dock was part of the Todd Pacific Shipyards in Brooklyn who formed the professional soccer club in 1918 to play in the National Association Football League.   Robins played until the league folded in 1921.  Robins best finish was third in 1920 and 1921, but won the 1921 National Challenge Cup.

League
In 1918, the entry of the United States into World War I had led to a drain on players due to military service.  The loss of players impacted most league, including the NAFBL.  While most teams in the league were able to find enough players to begin the season, three teams were forced to sit out the season.  A fourth, the East Newark Scots-Americans, began the season but folded after five games.  In order to maintain enough teams to stage a competitive season, the NAFBL brought in the Robins Dry Dock which assumed the Scots-Americans record.  While Robins was unable to finish higher than third in its three seasons in the NAFBL, it quickly became dominant in national competitions.  In 1921, the top teams of the NAFBL collapsed when the league’s top teams joined with the top teams of the Southern New England Soccer League to form the American Soccer League.  Robins did not join the ASL.  Instead, Todd Shipyards, the parent company of Robins Dry Dock, as well as Tebo Yacht Basin which sponsored the Tebo Yacht Basin F.C. of the SENSL, entered its own team in the new league.

Cup winner
At the time there were two national cups, the long running American Cup and the recently established National Challenge Cup.  In March 1919, Robins went to the semifinals of the American Cup, falling to Bethlehem Steel F.C.  In 1920, Robins took its revenge on Bethlehem when it defeated the Steelmen in the American Cup final.  Robins repeated as cup champions the next year as well, defeating Fore River.  In the 1920 National Challenge Cup, Robins lost to Fore River in the semifinals.  The next year, Robins took the Challenge Cup in a 4-3 victory over St. Louis Scullin Steel F.C.

Year-by-year

External links
 National Association Football League standings

References

1918 establishments in New York City
Defunct soccer clubs in New York City
National Association Football League teams
Sports in Brooklyn
1921 disestablishments in New York (state)
Association football clubs established in 1918
Association football clubs disestablished in 1921
Works soccer clubs in the United States
U.S. Open Cup winners